Francesco Arca  (born November 19, 1979) is an Italian actor and Model

Biography
Born in Siena to a Sardinian father, in 2013 it was announced that he would be the successor of Ettore Bassi in the Austrian-Italian police TV series Inspector Rex. He played in the 16th, 17th and 18th season of the TV series Inspector Rex where he interpreted the role of Inspector Marco Terzani

Filmography

Films

Television

References
The information in this article is based on that in its italy equivalent.

External links
 
 

Living people
1979 births
21st-century Italian actors
Italian television personalities
Italian models
Italian film actors
Italian television actors